3. elpa is the Latvian rapper Gustavo's third studio album. It was released June 16, 2010. On July 19, 2010 a teaser for this album appeared on YouTube. "3. elpa" in Latvian means "Third Breath". The album features Renārs Kaupers, Ieva Kerēvica, Čižiks, El Mars and Lady's Sweet.

Track listing

References

External links
Gustavo official website

2010 albums
Gustavs Butelis albums